State Highway 4 (SH-4) is a state highway in Shoshone County, in the U.S. state of Idaho. It runs  from Interstate 90 (I-90) in Wallace, east to the ghost town of Burke.

Route description
SH-4 begins at an intersection with I-90 in Wallace, then heads generally northeast through Burke Canyon, past historical markers for Frisco Hill and Burke, ending in Burke.  The road continues eastward as National Forest Road No. 7623.

History
In the 1930s, Route 4 was envisioned as a cross-state route, to directly connect Wallace to Thompson Falls, Montana over Glidden Pass, as seen on the 1937 map (later routed over Cooper Pass).  This plan was abandoned due to impassable roads and World War II.  Paved SH-4 was truncated at Burke.

National Forest Road 7623 still connects Burke to Montana Secondary Highway 471 leading to Thompson Falls.

Major intersections

See also

 List of highways numbered 4

References

External links

004
Transportation in Shoshone County, Idaho